The name Longaví may refer to:
 Longaví River in Chile
 Nevado de Longaví The Longaví Andean peak, in Linares Province, Chile
 Longaví, Chile municipality and town, in Linares Province, Chile

ka:ლონგავი (მრავალმნიშვნელოვანი)